Tim Dorsey (born January 25, 1961) is an American novelist. He is known for a series starring Serge A. Storms, a mentally disturbed vigilante antihero who rampages across Florida enforcing his own moral code against a variety of low-life criminals.

Biography
Dorsey was born in Carmel, Indiana and was taken to Florida by his mother at the age of 1. He grew up in Riviera Beach, a small town in Palm Beach County just north of West Palm Beach. Dorsey graduated from Bishop Guertin High School in Nashua N.H, in 1979.

He attended Auburn University, where he became the editor of The Auburn Plainsman, the student newspaper; he wrote about racism while at Auburn. Dorsey graduated in 1983 with a Bachelor's degree in Transportation. After graduation, he moved to Montgomery, Alabama, and served as a police reporter for a local newspaper. In 1987, Dorsey relocated to Tampa, Florida, and became a reporter for The Tampa Tribune. Until he resigned from the paper in 1999 to write full-time, he worked variously as political reporter, correspondent in the Tribune's Tallahassee bureau, copy desk editor, and, finally, night metro editor and news coordinator.

Currently, Dorsey lives in Tampa with his wife and two daughters.  He is a Boston Red Sox fan due to his mother and the nuns and brothers from  Bishop Guertin High School he attended as a child being from New Hampshire. He is also a Tampa Bay Rays fan from living in the same city.

Serge Storms

Most of Dorsey's novels feature Serge A. Storms as the primary character. The character has several coexisting mental illnesses that render him obsessive, psychopathic, schizophrenic, and frequently homicidal, but Storms serves as the anti-hero in Dorsey's works due to his strong sense of moral absolutism and justice. Serge is intelligent, and frequently devises wildly inventive ways of condemning villains (or at least who he perceives as such) to death. His co-pilot in the majority of his adventures is Coleman, whose personality is the exact opposite of Serge. Whereas Serge is a high-strung straight-edged coffee addict, Coleman is an alcoholic drug user who goes to extreme lengths to maintain his buzz.

Novels by Tim Dorsey

Short stories and Essay collections by Tim Dorsey 
Florida Roadkill: A Survival Guide (2010)
Squall Lines: Selected articles & essays (2012) 
Tropical Warning: An Original Serge Storms Story and Other Debris (2013)

External links
Tim Dorsey's website
Powells' Interview with Tim Dorsey
Tim Dorsey on Amazon
Harper Collins page

References

1961 births
20th-century American novelists
21st-century American novelists
American crime fiction writers
American male novelists
Auburn University alumni
Living people
Writers from Montgomery, Alabama
Writers from Tampa, Florida
20th-century American male writers
21st-century American male writers
Novelists from Florida
Novelists from Alabama
Bishop Guertin High School alumni